Sagittidae is a family of sagittoideans in the order Aphragmophora.

Genera
Aidanosagitta Tokioka & Pathansali, 1963
Caecosagitta Tokioka, 1965
Decipisagitta Bieri, 1991
Ferosagitta Kassatkina, 1971
Flaccisagitta Tokioka, 1965
Mesosagitta Tokioka, 1965
Parasagitta Tokioka, 1965
Pseudosagitta Germain & Joubin, 1912
Sagitta Quoy & Gaimard, 1827
Serratosagitta Tokioka & Pathansali, 1963
Solidosagitta Tokioka, 1965
Zonosagitta Tokioka, 1965

References

Further reading
Kassatkina, A. P. (2007). Review of the genera of the family Sagittidae with separation of a new subfamily and description of a new species of the genus Sagitta from the Sea of Japan (Chaetognatha). Zoosystematica Rossica, 16(2), 157–162.

Chaetognatha
Protostome families